The statue of Saint Joseph (Czech: Kašna se sochou svatého Josefa) is located in front of New Town Hall on Charles Square (Karlovo náměstí), in Prague, Czech Republic.

External links

 

Fountains in the Czech Republic
Monuments and memorials in Prague
New Town, Prague
Outdoor sculptures in Prague
Sculptures of men in the Czech Republic
Sculptures of Saint Joseph
Statues in Prague